Beaches was a provincial riding in Toronto, Ontario represented in the  Legislative Assembly of Ontario from 1926 to 1967. It was carved completely out of the existing riding of York East. Its boundaries remained the same until 1967 when it was merged with the neighbouring riding of Woodbine to become Beaches—Woodbine. Other than a single session in the 1940s, the riding was steadfastly Conservative in its voting preference.

Boundaries
The riding was created out of the East York riding just before the 1926 election. Its western boundary consisted of Woodbine Avenue from Lake Ontario north to the city limits. Its eastern boundary followed Victoria Park Avenue from the lake to the city limits. The northern boundary was the city limits and the southern boundary was Lake Ontario. The boundaries remained unchanged until it was abolished in 1967.

Members of Provincial Parliament

Election results

References

Notes

Citations

Former provincial electoral districts of Ontario
Provincial electoral districts of Toronto